Arthur Rinderknech (born 23 July 1995) is a French tennis player. He has a career-high ATP singles ranking of world No. 42 achieved on 31 October 2022. He also has a career-high ATP doubles ranking of world No. 124 achieved on 8 November 2021.

Personal life
Rinderknech's mother is former tennis player Virginie Paquet. Monégasque tennis player Benjamin Balleret is his cousin. He is a fan of French football club AS Saint-Étienne.

College career
Rinderknech played college tennis at Texas A&M University.

Professional career

2018–2020: Grand Slam singles and doubles debut
Rinderknech made his Grand Slam main draw debut as a wildcard at the 2018 French Open in doubles partnering Florian Lakat. 

He also entered as a wildcard the first rounds of the 2020 French Open on his singles main draw debut and doubles main draw partnering with Manuel Guinard and reached the second round in doubles.

2021: ATP & Top 100 debut, First Major win, Maiden doubles final, Top 60
In his debut on the ATP Tour in March, Rinderknech qualified for the main draw of the 2021 Open 13 in Marseille, France, where he reached the quarterfinals, beating Alejandro Davidovich Fokina, before losing to fellow countryman Ugo Humbert.

In May at the 2021 ATP Lyon Open, Rinderknech recorded his first win, defeating 6th seeded Jannik Sinner, the first top-20 win in his career, to reach his second career quarterfinal as a lucky loser.

Rinderknech qualified for the 2021 Wimbledon Championships main draw for the first time in his career. In the first round he lost in only the second 12 games all singles supertiebreak since that rule began two years previously against Oscar Otte 6–4, 3–6, 2–6, 7–6(5), 12–13(2), the other match being the Federer-Djokovic 2019 final.

In July, he reached the quarterfinals as a qualifier at the 2021 Swedish Open in Båstad defeating 4th seed John Millman. As a result, he made his top 100 debut on 19 July 2021. At the 2021 Swiss Open Gstaad Rinderknech defeated second seed and World No. 16 Roberto Bautista Agut, his second top-20 win, to reach the quarterfinals. 

The following week, he reached the semifinals for the first time in his career at the Kitzbühel Open, losing to eventual winner Casper Ruud. As a result, he reached a new career-high of World No. 79 on 2 August 2021.

At the 2021 US Open he entered directly into the main draw for the first time and also reached the second round of a Grand Slam for the first time in his career defeating Miomir Kecmanović after a comeback from two sets down 6–7(10), 3–6, 7–5, 6–3, 6–4.

At the 2021 Moselle Open he reached his first ATP final in his career partnering Hugo Nys where they were defeated by Hubert Hurkacz and Jan Zieliński from Poland. Following a quarterfinal appearance at the 2021 Stockholm Open where he lost to defending champion, 3rd seed Denis Shapovalov, he made his debut in the top 60 at World No. 58 on 15 November 2021.

2022: First ATP singles final, Top 50 debut, French No. 1
Rinderknech started his 2022 season by representing France at the ATP Cup. France was in Group B alongside Russia, Italy, and Australia. He lost his first match to Roman Safiullin of Russia. He lost his second match to Jannik Sinner. He won his final match by beating James Duckworth of Australia. France ended in fourth place in Group B. 

At the Adelaide International 2, he defeated 3rd seed and runner-up of the first tournament, Karen Khachanov, in the quarterfinals, and qualifier and compatriot, Corentin Moutet, in the semifinals to reach his first final on the ATP Tour. In the final, he pushed Australian wildcard, Thanasi Kokkinakis, to three sets, but he ended up losing the match. As a result of reaching the final, he made his debut in the world's top 50 at No. 48 on 17 January 2022. 
Ranked No. 48 in his debut at the Australian Open, he won his first match at this Major defeating Australian Alexei Popyrin in the first round. He was set to play 24th seed, Dan Evans, in the second round, but he withdrew due to a wrist injury.

In February, Rinderknech competed at the Qatar ExxonMobil Open. He beat seventh seed, Alexander Bublik, in the second round. He then upset top seed and world No. 12, Denis Shapovalov, in the quarterfinals which not only earned him his third Top 20 win of his career, but he also reached his second semifinal of the year. He lost in his semifinal match to third seed, world No. 22, and defending champion, Nikoloz Basilashvili. In Dubai, he fell in the first round to eighth seed, world No. 15, and 2018 champion, Roberto Bautista Agut. 

Representing France during the Davis Cup tie against Ecuador, Rinderknech played one match and won over Emilio Gómez; France ended up beating Ecuador 4-0. 

At the Indian Wells Masters, he lost in the first round to Benjamin Bonzi. Seeded third at the Arizona Classic, an ATP Challenger tournament in Phoenix, he was defeated in the second round by Liam Broady. At the Miami Open, he recorded his first win at the Masters 1000 level against Laslo Djere but lost in the second round to eighth seed, world No. 10, and defending champion, Hubert Hurkacz.

Starting his clay-court season at the Monte-Carlo Masters, Rinderknech was eliminated in the first round by 2019 champion Fabio Fognini. At the Lyon Open, he lost in the first round to Holger Rune. Ranked No. 60 at the French Open, he was defeated in the first round by Bublik. 
As the top seed at the Poznań Open, an ATP Challenger tournament, Rinderknech won his ninth ATP Challenger title by beating Tomás Barrios Vera in the final.

Rinderknech started his grass-court season at the BOSS Open in Stuttgart, Germany. He upset eighth seed and compatriot, Ugo Humbert, in the first round in three sets. He lost in the second round to compatriot Benjamin Bonzi. At the Halle Open, he fell in the first round of qualifying to Marc-Andrea Hüsler. Ranked No. 62 at Wimbledon, he lost in the first round to 13th seed, world No. 16, and last year semifinalist, Denis Shapovalov, in five sets.
After Wimbledon, Rinderknech competed at the Salzburg Open, an ATP Challenger tournament in Austria. As the top seed, he lost in the second round to Austrian wildcard Lukas Neumayer.

At the US Open, he recorded his third Major career win against compatriot Quentin Halys.
At the 2022 Moselle Open in Metz, he lost in the quarterfinals for the second time in the season to world No. 10 and second seed Hubert Hurkacz. At the 2022 Tel Aviv Open he also reached the quarterfinals defeating third seed Diego Schwartzman but lost to Roman Safiullin for the second time in the season. At the 2022 Gijón Open he reached his third tour-level semifinal for the season saving nine match points against second seed Pablo Carreno Busta in an over three hours match. At the 2022 Swiss Indoors he defeated fourth seed Marin Cilic in the first round after qualifying for the main draw. He then won against Alex Molcan to reach the quarterfinals. As a result he became the French No. 1 in the rankings at world No. 42 on 31 October 2022 ahead of Adrian Mannarino.

He received a wildcard to participate in his home tournament, the 2022 Rolex Paris Masters for a second year in a row.

Performance timelines

Singles 

Current through the 2022 Paris Masters.

Doubles 
Current through the 2022 Qatar ExxonMobil Open.

ATP career finals

Singles: 1 (1 runner-up)

Doubles: 1 (1 runner-up)

Challenger and Futures finals

Singles: 16 (9–7)

Doubles: 7 (4–3)

Record against top 10 players
Rinderknech's record against players who have been ranked in the top 10, with those who are active in boldface. Only ATP Tour main draw matches are considered:

References

External links
 
 
 

1995 births
Living people
French male tennis players
Texas A&M Aggies men's tennis players
Sportspeople from Var (department)
21st-century French people